Le Canto is the first album Spanish language version of Kari Jobe, which translated to "I'm Singing", which is also the name of the debut single. Unlike the album in English, Le Canto features two songs not featured on original album. Le Canto was released on April 28, 2009. The album Le Canto won a Dove Award in the category, Spanish Album of the Year at the 41st GMA Dove Awards.

Critical reception

Awarding the album with three stars out of five, Andree Farias from Allmusic's said "If one didn't know a word of Spanish, Kari Jobe's Le Canto would sound exactly like what it is: the Spanish-language version of her wildly popular self-titled debut. She sings the heck out of the songs; the purity and conviction in her voice remain her strongest suit.

Track listing

NOTE:  These songs are Spanish-language translations of Kari Jobe songs in English.  The original English-language song is listed next to each title.

Awards
On February 18, 2010, Le Canto was nominated for a Dove Award for Spanish Language Album of the Year at the 41st GMA Dove Awards. 

Le Canto won a Dove Award in 2010 for Best Spanish Language Album of the Year.

Charts

References

2009 albums
Kari Jobe albums
Spanish-language albums
Columbia Records albums